Christmas in the Heart is the 34th studio album and first Christmas album by American singer-songwriter Bob Dylan, released on October 13, 2009, by Columbia Records. The album comprises a collection of hymns, carols, and popular Christmas songs. All Dylan's royalties from the sale of this album benefit the charities Feeding America in the USA, Crisis in the UK, and the World Food Programme in perpetuity.

Dylan said that, although he was born and raised Jewish (he converted to Christianity in the late 1970s), he never felt left out of Christmas during his childhood in Minnesota. Regarding the popularity of Christmas music, he said, "... it's so worldwide and everybody can relate to it in their own way".

The album opened at No. 1 on the Billboard Holiday Album chart, No. 5 on the Folk Album chart, No. 10 on the Rock Album chart and No. 23 on the overall album charts. As with most of Dylan's 21st century output, he produced it himself under the pseudonym Jack Frost.

Recording
The album was recorded at Jackson Browne's Groove Masters Studio in Santa Monica. In addition to Dylan's Never Ending Tour band, the sessions featured contributions from other musicians including Los Lobos' David Hidalgo, Chess Records veteran Phil Upchurch, and a choir that included Amanda Barrett and Abby DeWald (better known as folk music duo The Ditty Bops).

When asked in an interview if Dylan played classic recordings of Christmas songs for the musicians as reference points, Hidalgo responded:

In an interview published by Street News Service, journalist Bill Flanagan asked Dylan why he had performed the songs in a straightforward style, and Dylan responded: 
 
When Flanagan reported that some critics thought the album was an ironic treatment of Christmas songs, Dylan responded:

Release and promotion

Nash Edgerton directed an official music video for the song "Must Be Santa" that was released on November 16, 2009 and described as "bonkers" by Rolling Stone. The video depicts Dylan and some holiday revelers lip synching the song at a raucous Christmas house party. Count Smokula makes an unexpected appearance as an accordion player, miming the accordion part that David Hidalgo played on the actual recording. One of the guests instigates a fight and leaves the party by jumping through a living-room window. In the closing scene, Dylan and Santa Claus are on the front porch together watching the rabble-rouser's departure. As of Christmastime 2021, the video had been viewed over seven million times on YouTube, significantly more times than the next most popular versions of the song (i.e., those recorded by Mitch Miller, Raffi, and Brave Combo). "Must Be Santa" was also released as a music video ecard and a 7" single, the B-side of which is a recording of Dylan reading 'Twas the Night Before Christmas that was first broadcast on Theme Time Radio Hour.

Dylan released a second music video to promote Christmas in the Heart, for "The Little Drummer Boy", on December 9, 2009. Directed by artist/filmmaker Jeff Scher, the video features images from classic films (actress Jane Greer appears at the 2:10 mark) and home movies that have been rotoscoped with water colors and crayons in order to tell a modern version of the story of the Nativity of Jesus in the song's lyrics. The video, described by one critic as "the most beautiful Christmas gift Bob Dylan could give his fans", premiered on Amazon as part of the company's "12 Days of Christmas" promotion with the site linking directly to Feeding America, one of the charities benefiting from Christmas in the Heart's royalties. Dylan released a statement on Amazon along with the video, saying, “Happy Holidays Friends. Since this season is all about giving, I’d like to take a moment and mention the good people at Feeding America. They provide meals for over 25 million hungry Americans each year. If you have a moment, you can join me in contributing to this worthy charity”.

Packaging
The package design of Christmas in the Heart is credited to Coco Shinomiya who had designed Dylan's previous album Together Through Life. The album's cover, an illustration of a sleigh ride in a snowy landscape, is from an antique print. The back cover, an illustration of the Biblical Magi, is by artist Edwin Fotheringham. The inner sleeves feature a black-and-white photo by Leonard Freed of four musicians wearing Santa Claus suits as well as a drawing by Olivia De Berardinis of pinup Bettie Page dressed as Mrs. Claus.

Reception and legacy

At Metacritic, the album currently holds a score of 62 out of 100 based on 17 reviews, indicating generally favorable reviews.

While the unexpected move by Dylan to record a Christmas album was received with skepticism at first, the outcome of the project was lauded by critics for bringing a fresh breath of air into these classics.

Slant Magazines critic Jesse Cataldo awarded the album 4 stars out of 5 and said:

Se7en magazine's critic agreed, writing: 

The critic for Tiny Mix Tapes rated the album 4 stars out of 5, writing:
In 2020, Rolling Stone placed "Must Be Santa" 24th on a list of Dylan's best songs of the 21st century. The Big Issue listed the same song as #65 on a list of the "80 best Bob Dylan songs - that aren't the greatest hits". It was the only track included from Christmas in the Heart and an article accompanying the list proclaimed it to be "the best-ever Christmas album!" Dylan's version of the song has also proven influential on other artists: both She & Him, in 2016, and Kurt Vile, in 2022, have recorded the song in versions directly inspired by Dylan's.

Stereogum ran an article to coincide with Dylan's 80th birthday on May 24, 2021 in which 80 musicians were asked to name their favorite Dylan song. Girl Band's Dara Kiely selected "Hark the Herald Angels Sing" from Christmas in the Heart, noting, "It is earnest yet fun, serious yet joyful. His voice makes sense and he still means every word".

Charity project

Feeding America received Dylan's royalties from sales in the USA, while two further charities, the United Nations' World Food Programme and Crisis in the UK, received royalties from overseas sales.

Dylan said: 

Track listing

Personnel
Bob Dylan – vocals, guitar, electric piano, harmonica, producer
Tony Garnier – bass guitar
George Receli – drums, percussion
Donnie Herron – steel guitar, mandolin, trumpet, violin
David Hidalgo – accordion, guitar, mandolin, violin
Phil Upchurch – guitar
Patrick Warren – piano, organ, celesteAdditional musiciansAmanda Barrett, Bill Cantos, Randy Crenshaw, Abby DeWald, Nicole Eva Emery, Walt Harrah, Robert Joyce – choirTechnicalDavid Bianco – recording, mixing
Bill Lane – assistant engineering
David Spreng – additional engineering
Glen Suravech – assistant engineering
Rich Tosti – studio support
Ed Wong – studio supportArtwork'
Olivia De Berandis – inside cover illustration
Edwin Fotheringham – back cover illustration
Leonard Freed/Magnum Photos – inside photo
Coco Shinomiya – design
VisualLanguage.com – front cover

Charts

See also
 List of Billboard Top Holiday Albums number ones of the 2000s

References

External links
Lyrics and chords at Dylanchords
Bill Flanagan interview with Bob Dylan about Christmas in the Heart

2009 Christmas albums
Albums produced by Bob Dylan
Bob Dylan albums
Charity albums
Christmas albums by American artists
Columbia Records Christmas albums
Covers albums
Folk Christmas albums